Thryptomene urceolaris is a shrub species in the family Myrtaceae that is endemic to Western Australia.

It blooms between July and October producing pink-white flowers.

It is found on undulating plains Goldfields-Esperance regione of Western Australia in a large area centred around Kalgoorlie where it grows in sandy soils.

References

urceolaris
Endemic flora of Western Australia
Rosids of Western Australia
Taxa named by Ferdinand von Mueller
Plants described in 1876